John Dundas may refer to:

John Dundas (1808–1866), 1st Earl of Zetland, Lord Lieutenant of Orkney and Shetland, MP for Richmond and York
John Dundas (1845–1892), Lord Lieutenant of Orkney and Shetland, MP for Richmond
John Dundas (RAF officer) (1915–1940), World War II fighter ace